The Arlington Hotel Open was a PGA Tour event that was played from 1955 to 1963 at the Arlington golf course of the Hot Springs Country Club near the Arlington Hotel, now known as the Arlington Resort Hotel and Spa, a 484-room resort in the Ouachita Mountains of Hot Springs National Park in Arkansas. The event was also known as the Hot Springs Open or Hot Springs Open Invitational.  The Majestic Golf Course was constructed by Willie Park, Jnr. in 1898. The Arlington Golf Course was designed and built by William Diddle in 1927. Jimmy Demaret won the last of his 31 PGA Tour wins at this event in 1957.

Winners

References

Former PGA Tour events
Golf in Arkansas
Recurring sporting events established in 1955
Recurring events disestablished in 1963
1955 establishments in Arkansas
1963 disestablishments in Arkansas